Nipe may refer to:

Places
Nipe, a village in Risør municipality in Aust-Agder county, Norway
Nipe Bay, a bay on the northern coast of Cuba in Holguín Province
Nipe-Sagua-Baracoa, a mountain range of eastern Cuba
Nipe Formation, a geologic formation in Cuba
Nipe Glacier, a broad glacier in the Sør-Rondane Mountains in Antarctica

Other
NIPE or Net income per employee, a company's net income or revenue divided by the number of employees